In linear algebra, a square nonnegative matrix  of order  is said to be productive, or to be a Leontief matrix, if there exists a  nonnegative column matrix   such as  is a positive matrix.

History

The concept of productive matrix was developed by the economist Wassily Leontief (Nobel Prize in Economics in 1973) in order to model and analyze the relations between the different sectors of an economy. The interdependency linkages between the latter can be examined by the input-output model with empirical data.

Explicit definition

Here  denotes the set of r×c matrices of real numbers, whereas  and  indicates a positive and a nonnegative matrix, respectively.

Properties
The following properties are proven e.g. in the textbook (Michel 1984).

Characterization
Theorem
A nonnegative matrix  is productive if and only if  is invertible with a nonnegative inverse, where  denotes the  identity matrix.

Proof

"If" :
Let  be invertible with a nonnegative inverse,
Then the matrix  is nonnegative since it is the product of two nonnegative matrices.
Moreover, .
Therefore  is productive.
"Only if" :
Let  be productive, let  such that .
The proof proceeds by reductio ad absurdum. 
First, assume for contradiction  is singular.
The endomorphism canonically associated with  can not be injective by singularity of the matrix.
Thus some non-zero column matrix  exists such that .
Hence  is nonnegative and reached with at least one value .

, using that  by construction.
Second, assume for contradiction  is invertible but with at least one negative entry in its inverse.
Then  is positive and reached with at least one value .

, using that  by construction
Thus , contradicting .
Therefore  is necessarily nonnegative.

Transposition
Proposition
The transpose of a productive matrix is productive.

Proof

Let  a productive matrix.
Then  exists and is nonnegative.
Yet 
Hence  is invertible with a nonnegative inverse.
Therefore  is productive.

Application

With a matrix approach of the input-output model, the consumption matrix is productive if it is economically  viable and if the latter and the demand vector are nonnegative.

References 

Mathematical economics
Linear algebra
Matrices
Matrix theory